Walking the Line may refer to:
 Walking the Line (Oscar Peterson album)
 Walking the Line (Merle Haggard, George Jones and Willie Nelson album)